Nirmala Devi, also known as Nirmala Arun (7 June 1927  15 June 1996), was an Indian actress in the 1940s and a Hindustani classical vocalist of the Patiala Gharana. She is the mother of Bollywood actor Govinda.

Nirmala Devi was the wife of the 1940s actor Arun Kumar Ahuja. She has five children, including Indian film actor Govinda and film director Kirti Kumar. She died in 1996.

Personal life
Nirmala Devi was born on 7 June 1927, in the holy city of Varanasi (then known as Banares), Uttar Pradesh. 
She was married to actor Arun Kumar Ahuja in 1942. They had 5 children, 3 daughters and 2 sons. The sons are Indian film actor Govinda and film director Kirti Kumar. Nirmala took to acting during the period of her betrothal and her first film to be released was ‘Savera’ (meaning ‘Dawn), with husband Arun as co-star.

Nirmala Devi died on 15 June 1996, at the age of 69, in Mumbai.

Playback singer
Credited as Nirmala
 Savera (1942)
 Sharda
 Kanoon
 Geet 
 Gaali (1944)
 Sehra
 Janamashtami
Credited as Nirmala Devi
 Ram Teri Ganga Maili (1985)
 Bawarchi (1972)
 Zara Bachke (1959)
 Shama Parwana (1954)

Soundtrack
 Bawarchi (1972) – one of the performers on the track "Bhor Aai Gaya Andhiyara"

Filmography
Credited as Nirmala
 Savera (1942)
 Sharda
 Kanoon
Geet
 Gaali (1944)
Chalis Karod (1946)
 Sehra
 Janamashtami
 Anmol Ratan (1950)

Music albums
Genre - Hindustani Classical - Music Label - HMV (His Master's Voice Ltd, now known as SAREGAMA, India)
 
Singles:
 Banaa Banaa Ke Tamanaa & Gham Ki Nishani (Ghazal)
 Jaadu Bhare Tore Nainava Ram & Mori Baali Umar Beeti Jaye (Thumri)

Full Albums:
 Saavan Beetaa Jaye (Thumri) (With Ms Laxmi Shankar, contemporary singer)
 Weekend Pleasure (Thumri) 
 Thumriyan by Nirmala Devi (Thumri)
 Laakhon Ke Bol Sahe (Thumri)
 Ghazals by Nirmala Devi (Ghazal)

References

1927 births
1996 deaths
Hindustani singers
Indian film actresses
Place of birth missing
20th-century Indian singers
Singers from Uttar Pradesh
Women Hindustani musicians
20th-century Indian women singers
Women musicians from Uttar Pradesh
Actresses from Uttar Pradesh
Indian women classical singers
20th-century Indian actresses
Actresses in Hindi cinema
20th-century Khyal singers